Eveli Saue (born February 13, 1984) is an Estonian orienteering competitor and retired biathlete. She is world champion in the combined sport biathlon orienteering.

Orienteering
She received a bronze medal in the short course at the 2003 Junior World Orienteering Championships in Põlva.

Biathlon
She participated in biathlon at the 2006 Winter Olympics in Turin, where she finished 47th in the sprint and 73rd in the individual. At the 2010 Winter Olympics in Vancouver she finished 18th in the 4×6 km relay, 42nd in the 15 km individual and 55th in the 7.5 km sprint

Biathlon orienteering 
She received a gold medal in sprint at the World Championship in biathlon orienteering in Haanja in 2006.

See also

 Estonian orienteers
 List of orienteers
 List of orienteering events

References

External links
 
 
 
 Eveli Saue at World of O Runners
 
 

1984 births
Living people
People from Kärdla
Estonian orienteers
Estonian female biathletes
Biathletes at the 2006 Winter Olympics
Biathletes at the 2010 Winter Olympics
Olympic biathletes of Estonia
Foot orienteers
Female orienteers
Junior World Orienteering Championships medalists